Grant Thornton is the world's seventh-largest by revenue and sixth-largest by number of employees professional services network of independent accounting and consulting member firms which provide assurance, tax and advisory services to privately held businesses, public interest entities, and public sector entities. Grant Thornton International Ltd. is a not-for-profit, non-practising, international umbrella membership entity organised as a private company limited by guarantee. Grant Thornton International Ltd. is incorporated in London, England, and has no share capital.

According to Grant Thornton International Ltd (GTIL), member firms within the global organisation operate in 147 markets employing over 68,000 personnel for a combined global revenue of US$7.2 billion.

History

20th century
The earliest origins of the name date back to 1904, when the UK firm of Thornton and Thornton was formed in Oxford.  Through a series of name changes this firm merged in 1959 with another UK firm, Baker & Co, which traced its origins to 1868, to form the firm Thornton Baker.  In 1975 Thornton Baker merged with Kidston, Jackson, McBain, a UK firm which traced its origins to the Glaswegian accountant, Robert McCowan, who set up in practice in 1844, and was a founder of the Institute of Accountants and Actuaries in Glasgow in 1853.

In the US, 26-year-old Alexander Richardson Grant founded Alexander Grant & Co in Chicago in 1924. Grant had been a senior accountant with Ernst & Ernst (now EY). Alexander Grant was committed to providing services to mid-sized companies.
 
When Grant died in 1938, Alexander Grant & Co survived the change in leadership and continued to grow nationally. In 1969, Alexander Grant & Co joined with firms from Australia, Canada, and the United States to establish the organisation of Alexander Grant Tansley Witt. This organisation operated successfully for 10 years.
 
In 1980 Alexander Grant & Co and Thornton Baker, firms with similar qualities, clients, personnel numbers and values, joined with 49 other firms to form a global organisation, Grant Thornton. In 1986, Alexander Grant & Co and Thornton Baker changed their names to Grant Thornton, reflecting their mutual affiliation and strategic alignment.

21st century 
In December 2019 Grant Thornton placed in the top 50 global employers for diversity and inclusion (D&I), according to a new index developed by Universum. More than 247,000 business and engineering/IT students rated Grant Thornton against support for gender equality, commitment to diversity & inclusion and respect for its people. Their perception of Grant Thornton, against these three categories, places the network 28th in the list, alongside some of the world's most well-known and respected global brands.

In 2018 Grant Thornton UK LLP, the UK member firm of the network, was fined £4 million for audit misconduct after a former partner joined the audit committees of two organisations while Grant Thornton UK LLP was still auditing them. Later that year, for unrelated reasons, Grant Thornton UK LLP's chief executive Sacha Romanovitch, their first female chief executive, announced she would step down.

In September 2019, Grant Thornton (along with other defendants) entered into a settlement agreement with VEREIT stockholders to settle pending class action litigation against Grant Thornton regarding among other things alleged violations of Section 11 of the 1933 Act (In re American Realty Capital Properties, Inc. Litigation and the remaining opt-out actions), at a cost to Grant Thornton of $49 million.

Recently the US firm in the network declared their highest turnover in history of $1.9 billion which was a YoY increase of 5.4% over the previous year.

Recent significant mergers 
In 1987 Grant Thornton merged with Carter Chaloner & Kearns.
Grant Thornton UK merged with RSM Robson Rhodes in July 2007.
Grant Thornton Russia merged with Rosexpertiza in January 2012.
Grant Thornton China merged with Ascenda CPA in January 2012.
In May 2012 Grant Thornton Australia merged with several former BDO offices in Melbourne and Sydney.
In July 2013, Grant Thornton Johannesburg merged with the local PKF member firm.
In February 2018, Grant Thornton South Africa merged with SizweNtsalubaGobodo.
In July 2018, Grant Thornton Japan added the Yusei Audit Co. and Yamada & partners Certified Public Tax Accountants’ Co. to the network, bringing Grant Thornton's total headcount in Japan to over 1,600 people with combined revenues of over US$170 million.

Although many of the firms now carry the Grant Thornton name, they are not all members of one international partnership. Each member firm is a separate national entity, and governs itself and manages its administrative matters independently on a local basis. This is similar to other professional services networks.

Member firms
Grant Thornton member firms service international work through their local International Business Centres — located in 40 major commercial centres throughout the world.

Grant Thornton International Ltd. carries out an annual global research project: The Grant Thornton International Business Report, which (since 1992) surveys the views and expectations of over 10,000 privately held mid-market businesses across 28 economies.

Controversies and criticisms

Quality of audit work
In its 2022 annual review, the UK's Financial Reporting Council (FRC) found that Grant Thornton UK LLP was the only Tier 1 firm1 to have all of the files reviewed by the FRC in the highest quality grading bracket awarded (“Good or limited improvements required”). The seven Tier 1 firms are: BDO LLP, Deloitte LLP, Ernst & Young LLP (EY), Grant Thornton UK LLP (GT), KPMG LLP, Mazars LLP, PricewaterhouseCoopers LLP (PwC).

Nichols plc and the University of Salford
In 2018, the UK's FRC fined Grant Thornton £4m, later reduced to £3m, for misconduct over its audits of Nichols plc and the University of Salford. Three partners were given personal fines of £60,000.

Patisserie Valerie
In 2021 the FRC fined Grant Thornton £4m for failures in its audits of Patisserie Valerie. The £4m fine was reduced to £2.34m, mainly due to Grant Thornton’s co-operation with the investigation. The auditor responsible, David Newstead, was also fined £150,000, reduced to £87,750, and was banned from carrying out audits for three years.

Grant Thornton had lost the audit of Patisserie Valerie in 2019 after it failed to spot a £94m accounting black hole in its books, thereby triggering an investigation by the FRC. Patisserie Valerie went into liquidation in January 2019. Later, the chain was found to have overstated its cash position by £30m and failed to disclose overdrafts of nearly £10m. The liquidation lead to the closure of 70 stores and more than 900 job losses.

The company's chief executive, David Dunckley, told UK Members of Parliament it was not his firm's job to uncover fraud or to judge whether a company's financial figures were correct. Discussing the company's failure to uncover fraud at Patisserie Valerie, he said: “If people are colluding and there is a sophisticated fraud, that may not be caught by normal audit procedures.” Rachel Reeves MP said “But in a shop that sells tea and cakes, you’d sort of think that might be spotted. It’s not a multinational complex organisation.” She also said that the FRC's rules require auditors to spot material misstatements where they are due to fraud or error.

Restructuring firm FRP Advisory investigated whether it could claim against Grant Thornton for failures to identify suspected wrongdoing with Patisserie Valerie accounts, and in November 2020, it issued a claim for damages against Grant Thornton in respect of "negligent audits" of the group companies' financial statements.

Interserve
In 2019 the FRC instituted an investigation into Grant Thornton's audits of the failed outsourcing company Interserve between 2015 and 2017. Interserve had amassed debts of £738m following numerous acquisitions, a failed probation service contract and an investment in energy-from-waste plants. Grant Thornton and the partner involved were fined £1.3m by the FRC in 2021 for 'scepticism failure'.

£650,000 fine for the audit of an unnamed company
The FRC fined Grant Thornton £650,000 over a series of errors in its 2016 audit of an unnamed company. It found that the auditor had failed to adequately gauge the true value of the company's assets, before flagging them as a “significant risk”. The regulator said the firm had selected too small a sample size and had placed “undue reliance” on the externally appointed experts rather than its own specialist. The FRC also said the auditor had failed “to exercise sufficient professional scepticism and to prepare adequate audit documentation.”

Sports Direct
The FRC conducted an investigation into Grant Thornton's 2016 audit of Sports Direct. The sports retailer used Barlin Delivery to deliver merchandise to its customers, and in the process made large undisclosed payments to Barlin, which was owned by John Ashley, the brother of Sports Direct's owner Mike Ashley. The FRC examined Grant Thornton's failure to disclose the relationship between Sports Direct and Barlin. In 2020 the UK Court of Appeal determined that Sports Direct did not have to disclose 40 documents sought by the FRC because they were covered by legal privilege.

Conviviality Retail
The FRC fined the company £1.95m for ethical failures after it tried to conceal evidence of involvement in the audit of the failed alcohol retailer Conviviality Retail. The regulator found that the company had not maintained an independent stance during the audit and had committed “firm-wide” ethical failings between 2014 and 2017. Senior manager Natasha Toy was severely reprimanded after she tried to remove an entry from the audit file which indicated involvement.

Assetco
Grant Thornton was ordered pay £21 million, the second-largest award against a UK auditor, in damages to its former client AssetCo, a fire engine leasing company, plus £5 million to pay Assetco's legal costs. The judge found it had committed negligence “of the utmost gravity”. An appeal judge reduced the damages to £20.8m, before a 25% deduction for contributory negligence.

Brighthouse liquidation
After being appointed as the liquidator of the failed retailer Brighthouse, Grant Thornton was accused of maximising returns to creditors at the expense of vulnerable customers. The company was found to be offering the 140,000 rent-to-own customers an initial 28-day payment holiday, one-third of the period recommended by the FCA. Mick McAteer, co-founder of the Financial Inclusion Centre thinktank, said: “There is a potential conflict between the interests of the administrator – and those they represent – and the vulnerable customers who owe money to BrightHouse."

Corruption
In September 2022, Western Australia's Corruption and Crime Commission (CCC) found that senior public servants had made offers to secure lucrative consulting work from the state government to Grant Thornton Australia. A CCC report found that two senior officials in the Department of Communities had been given over $100,000 worth of alcohol, meals, gifts, sporting tickets, flights and accommodation. Additionally, Grant Thornton employed a family member of one of the public servants. In return, the public servants breached state government procurement policies, including by engaging in bid rigging, ultimately directing consulting work to Grant Thornton.

See also
Big Four accounting firms: KPMG, PwC, EY, and Deloitte
Crowe Global
BDO Global
Grant Thornton LLP
Accounting networks and associations
Professional services networks

References

 
International management consulting firms
Consulting firms established in 1980
1980 establishments in England